The Iroquois Tree of Peace finds its roots in a man named Dekanawida, the peace-giver. The legends surrounding his place amongst the Iroquois (the Haudenosaunee) is based in his role in creating the Five Nations Confederacy, which consisted of the Mohawks, Oneidas, Onondagas, Cayugas, and Senecas, and his place as a cultural hero to the Haudenosaunee Nation, commonly known in Western culture as "Iroquois". The official title of the confederacy is, Kayanerenh-kowa (the Great Peace) as described by Paul A. Wallace, "it is also known as Kanonsionni (the Long-House), a term that describes both its geographical extent and its constitutional form". The myths and legends surrounding Dekanawida have the roots in the oral histories that followed many Native American tribes throughout their histories.

A political reality, with mythic proportions, the association of Dekanawida and the Tree of Peace is central to the Haudenosaunee. Dekanawida, on his travels to bring the warring Nations together, talked only of peace, friendship, and unity. As Barbara Graymont states, "Dekanawida's ideas and actions were noticeably separating him from his people. The Wyandots could not understand a man who loved peace more than war." The Great Peace associated with Dekanawida came with three parts

The Good Word, which is righteousness in action, bringing justice for all.
Health, which is a sound mind in a sound body, bringing peace on Earth.
Power, which is the establishment of civil authority, bringing with it the increase in spiritual power in keeping with will of the Master of Life.

The creation of the Five Nations was given a symbol by Dekanawida that would symbolize the newly accepted peace and unity of the five nations. The symbol chosen for the League of the Five Nations was the great white pine tree, "the tree of the Great Long Leaves"

This tree of peace became the symbol of solitude among the chiefs. The creation of the tree of peace figuratively gave the chiefs the ability never to die, "because their chiefly titles would be passed down to their successors forever. In this way, the League of Nations would always be kept alive".

The Tree of Peace has its roots in the creation of the League of Five Nations, but its place within the Haudenosaunee culture is crucial to its role in the continuation of its existence to this day. As A. C. Parker states, "The Tree of Peace is an important symbol of peace in Iroquois tradition and in the historical record of diplomacy between the Iroquois and Westerners. Weapons would be buried under a tree to seal a peace agreement. A tree might even be uprooted to create a cavity for the weapons. The replanted tree on top would become a tree of peace." This concept of creating a new Tree of Peace is rooted in the tradition created by Dekanawida's initial ceremony for the Tree of Peace. The roots will stretch in all directions and it is upon these roots our future brothers and sisters must forge their own peace and continue to the path we have created. As Barbara Graymont states,

Its characteristic bundles of five needles became the symbol of the Five Nations joined together as one. According to Haudenosaunee tradition, the Great Law of Peace ended the ancient cycle of enmity and continuous conflict between the separate tribes and united them into the Iroquois Confederacy that made them into the most powerful force in North America until the rapid expansion of European colonization in the 18th century.

References 

Iroquois culture
Peace symbols
Trees